Wilson Ramón Torres Zapata "Rawy Torres" is a Puerto Rican singer, composer, and guitarist, who was a member of the boy band, Menudo.

Biography
Torres joined Menudo in 1989, replacing Ricky Martin. Torres gained teen idol status in Latin America when Menudo released the Los Últimos Héroes CD. Torres also recorded a Portuguese version for his first album called Os Últimos Heróis.

Torres and bandmate Robert Avellanet both left Menudo in 1991, and almost immediately joined Euphoria, that had some success but broke up.

In 1999, Rawy went to Los Angeles, California where he produced and recorded his first solo album called Por si de amor se trata.

Torres then started a bachelor's degree in Business that was completed with honors in 2004 with a major in marketing.

Rawy Torres joined some of his former bandmates in a reunion group that was inspired by the success of El Reencuentro, another group that was composed by six former Menudos from the early 1980s. Torres and his fellow former Menudo bandmates, including Avellanet, named their reunion group Los Últimos Héroes.

Discography

 Studio albums in Spanish (Menudo)
 Los Ultimos Heroes CD (1989)
 No me corten el pelo (1990)
 Studio albums in Spanish (Euphoria)
 Euphoria CD (1991)
 Studio albums in Portuguese (Menudo)
 Os Ultimos Herois (1990)

COMPILATIONS
 Navidad Boricua (2002)
 Navidad Boricua (2003)
 Navidad Boricua (2004)

SOLO ALBUMS
 Por si de amor se trata (1999)

COLLABORATIONS (As Producer)
 Por si de amor se trata (1999)
 Mary Ann (2006)
 Valentina Moure (2010)

COLLABORATIONS (As Songwriter)
 Por si de amor se trata (1999)
 Lourdes Robles (2000)
 Mary Ann (2006)

Filmography

Theater

Tours
Los Ultimos Heroes Tour (1989–9090)
No me corten el pelo Tour (1990–1991)
Por si de amor se trata Tour (1999–2001)
Los Ultimos Heroes Tour (2003–2005)

References

External links
Rawy Torres Official Site
Rawy Torres (Video La Razon)
Prpop.org
 

Living people
Puerto Rican male composers
Puerto Rican guitarists
Menudo (band) members
20th-century Puerto Rican male singers
People from Mayagüez, Puerto Rico
American performers of Christian music
Puerto Rican pop singers
American male guitarists
21st-century Puerto Rican male singers
Year of birth missing (living people)